Guzmania marantoidea is a plant species in the genus Guzmania. This species is native to Peru and Bolivia, and is found in the elevation range of 900–2700 metres above sea level. It is similar to Guzmania paniculata, but with more branches in its inflorescence and "longer, more laxly flowered ultimate branches." G. marantoidea is a herbaceous plant.

References

marantoidea
Flora of Bolivia
Flora of Peru
Plants described in 1920